2003–04 Eerste Klasse was a Dutch association football season of the Eerste Klasse.

Saturday champions were:
A: RKAV Volendam
B: BVV Barendrecht
C: Kozakken Boys
D: Excelsior '31
E: ONS Sneek

Sunday champions were:
A: DWV
B: UVS Leiden
C: VV Geldrop
D: EVV Echt
E: VV Germania
F: WKE '16

Eerste Klasse seasons
4